Saint-Tharcisius is a parish municipality in Quebec, Canada.

The village was named after Roman martyr Tarcisius who preferred to be killed rather than desecrate the Eucharist in the 3rd century.

Demographics 

See also
 List of parish municipalities in Quebec

References

Parish municipalities in Quebec
Incorporated places in Bas-Saint-Laurent
La Matapédia Regional County Municipality